Young Communist League (in Portuguese: União dos Jovens Comunistas) was the youth wing of the Portuguese Communist Party. UJC was founded in 1975.

On November 10, 1979 UJC merged with the Communist Students League (UEC) to form the Portuguese Communist Youth (JCP).

Youth wings of political parties in Portugal
Youth wings of communist parties
Portuguese Communist Party